is a Japanese shōjo manga series written and illustrated by Mari Asabuki based on the 2010 arcade game Pretty Rhythm: Mini Skirt. Pretty Rhythm was serialized in the monthly manga magazine Ribon from the August 2010 issue to the June 2012 issue. The series ran concurrent to the manga adaptation of Pretty Rhythm: Aurora Dream in Ciao.

Plot

A new sport called "Prism Dance Skate", which combines figure skating and dance, has become popular with the creation of Prism Skates, shoes that allow people to ice skate on any surface. Junior high school student Rizumu Amamiya enrolls in the Prism Dance Academy to become a professional Prism Star. At the Prism Dance Academy, Rizumu meets Serena Jōnouchi and Kanon Tōdō, and together, they compete under the team name Asterism.

Characters

Asterism

Rizumu is a clumsy second-year middle school student with a positive approach and a hardworking attitude.

Serena is a top student at the Prism Dance Academy and is popular in class.

Kanon is Hibiki's younger sister.

Callings

Hibiki is a popular Prism Star who is serious and level-headed.

Wataru is a Prism Star who often flirts with other girls.

Media

Manga

Pretty Rhythm is written and illustrated by Mari Asabuki and is an adaptation of the 2010 arcade game Pretty Rhythm: Mini Skirt. It was serialized in the monthly magazine Ribon from the August 2010 issue released on July 3, 2010, to the June 2012 issue released on May 2, 2012. The chapters were later released in 5 bound volumes by Shueisha under the Ribon Mascot Comics imprint. The series ran concurrent to the manga adaptation of Pretty Rhythm: Aurora Dream in Ciao.

References

Figure skating in anime and manga
Japanese idols in anime and manga
Manga based on video games
Pretty Rhythm
Shōjo manga
Shueisha manga
Sports anime and manga